Lesch is a surname. Notable people with the surname include:

 Carl Lesch, American Roman Catholic educator
 Gabriela Lesch, German runner
 George Henry Lesch, American businessman
 Harald Lesch, German physicist
 John Lesch, American politician
 Karin Lesch, Swiss-German actress
 Klaus-Peter Lesch, German psychiatrist
 Michael Lesch, Jewish American physician and medical educator

See also
 Lesh, a surname and given name